Downingtown High School is a secondary school located in Downingtown, Pennsylvania and Uwchlan Township, Pennsylvania.  Population growth in the burgeoning Downingtown Area School District forced the original Downingtown High School to split into two campuses: Downingtown High School East Campus and Downingtown High School West Campus. While still legally considered one school, the two campuses (usually referred to simply as "East" or "West") are generally regarded as separate entities.

The West Campus is located on the original high school's campus within Downingtown Borough. A portion of the campus is in Caln Township.

The East Campus is actually located in Uwchlan Township. It has an Exton postal address and is adjacent to, but not within, the Lionville census-designated place.

The mascot for Downingtown East is the cougar; for Downingtown West, the whippet. Both schools' colors are blue and gold, a similarity that recalls that the two campuses were once one school. A healthy rivalry exists between Downingtown East and West. Both schools are known for athletics and have won titles in different sports.

Athletics
Downingtown East and West campuses field the following sports:
Fall
Cross country
Field hockey
Football
Golf
Soccer
Tennis
Volleyball
Marching Band
Winter
Basketball
Ice Hockey
Indoor track & field
Swimming & diving
Wrestling
Spring
Baseball
Softball
Lacrosse
Tennis
Track & field

Extracurriculars

Downingtown High School has many clubs, from marching band to the ski club. The Student Council forms many committees and community service programs throughout the year.  Both schools also have FBLA-PBL clubs (Future Business Leaders of America) which had nine students qualify for the national competition in 2003, seven students qualify for the national competition in 2014, and five qualify in 2015. The combined school's marching band has participated in the Tournament of Roses Parade, the Citrus Bowl Parade and the Indy 500 Parade. In 2011, the band performed in the Tournament of Roses Parade for the second time; in 2022, for the third time.

Extracurriculars activities include:
Student Council
National Honor Society
Theatre Association
Music Ensembles (band, orchestra, choir)
Afro Appreciation Club
Ecology Club (the oldest in the nation)
Ski Club
Academic Team
Schools for Schools
Robotics Club
German Club
French Club
Spanish Club
Japanese Club
Photography Club
Key Club
Science Olympiad
Gay-Straight Alliance
Movie Critics Club
Bowling Club
Art Club

Notable alumni
Cary Angeline (East campus), football player
Dan Chisena (East campus), football player
Dave Days (East campus), musician
Pat Devlin (East campus), football player
Becky Edwards (West campus), soccer player
Arlen Harris, football player
Brian Kelly, lacrosse player
Tyler Kroft (East campus), football player
Kyle Lauletta (East campus), football player
Tina Nicholson, basketball player
Daniel Ochefu (East campus), basketball player 
Jeff Parke, soccer player
Scott Petri, Pennsylvania state representative
Curt Schroder, Pennsylvania state representative
Sara Shepard, author of Pretty Little Liars
Paul Siever, football player
Brian Sims, Pennsylvania state representative
Tora Suber, basketball player
Zack Steffen (West campus), soccer player
Elijah Wilkinson (West campus), football player
Greg Wilson, soccer player and coach

References

External links
 Downingtown High School East website
 Downingtown High School West website
 Downingtown High School Alumni Association
 Downingtown High School Music Parents Association
 Blue and Gold Marching Band Rose Parade website
 Downingtown East theatre website
 Downingtown West theatre website

1874 establishments in Pennsylvania
Downingtown Area School District
Educational institutions established in 1874
Public high schools in Pennsylvania
Schools in Chester County, Pennsylvania